A list of German politicians and party members by political party:

List of Bavarian Christian Social Union politicians
List of Bavarian People's Party politicians
List of German Centre Party politicians
List of German Christian Democratic Union politicians
List of German Communist Party politicians
List of German Democratic Party politicians
List of German Free Democratic Party politicians
List of German Green Party politicians
List of German National People's Party politicians
List of Independent Social Democratic Party politicians
List of German Left Party politicians
List of Liberal Democratic Party of Germany politicians
List of National Democratic Party of Germany politicians
List of Nazi Party members
List of Social Democratic Party of Germany politicians